The University of Chester is a public university located in Chester, England. 
The university originated as the first purpose-built teacher training college in the UK.
As a university, it now occupies five campus sites in and around Chester, one in Warrington, and a University Centre in Shrewsbury. 
It offers a range of foundation, undergraduate and postgraduate courses, as well as undertaking academic research.

The university is a member of AACSB, the Association of Commonwealth Universities, the Cathedrals Group, the North West Universities Association and Universities UK. It holds the Silver Award in the Teaching Excellence Framework (TEF).

The University of Chester is the fifth oldest higher education establishment in England, with only the universities of Oxford, Cambridge, Durham and London predating it.

History

1839 to 2000 

The university was founded as Chester Diocesan Training College in 1839 by a distinguished group of local leading figures in the Church of England, including future Prime Ministers William Ewart Gladstone and the 14th Earl of Derby. It was the UK's first purpose-built teacher training college, which makes it one of the longest established higher education institutions in the country. In 1842, Gladstone opened the college's original buildings for its first intake of ten male student teachers on the Parkgate Road site, (just outside the City Walls), that the university occupies today.

In 1921, Chester formally became an affiliated college of the University of Liverpool, which meant that the University of Liverpool awarded Chester's qualifications and Chester's students were able to use Liverpool's facilities.

The institution was threatened with closure in the 1930s, but its future was secured by the Bishop of Chester in 1933. From then on, the college continued to grow steadily. By the 1960s, as the UK was massively expanding its higher education capacity in reaction to the Robbins Report, the college was considered as a possible candidate for university status. These proposals, however, were not followed through.

The college continued to expand and women were first admitted in 1961. In 1963, the government renamed teacher training colleges to colleges of education, so Chester's name became Chester College of Education. In 1974, the number of courses was expanded beyond teacher education to include Bachelor of Arts and Bachelor of Science degrees. To reflect its wider remit, the college was renamed Chester College of Higher Education.

In the early 1990s the School of Nursing and Midwifery (now the Faculty of Health and Social Care) was established. The college also began to offer a Bachelor of Theology degree, HNDs and more postgraduate courses, such as master's degrees and PhDs. It also embarked on a £10 million campus improvement programme. By 1996, Chester had earned the right to call itself University College Chester. This name, however, was short-lived as the government changed the requirements for university colleges in 1999 to include only those that had their own degree-awarding powers. Thus, Chester had to drop the 'University College' tag and reverted to the title Chester College of Higher Education, though the more descriptive Chester, a College of the University of Liverpool was frequently used in publicity material.

2000 to present 

The college expanded in 2002 through the acquisition of the higher education faculty and campus of Warrington Collegiate Institute. (The further and adult education campuses of Warrington remained independent and was known as Warrington Collegiate, until in August 2017, when it merged with Mid Cheshire College.))

In 2003 Chester was granted its own degree-awarding powers, allowing it to be known as University College Chester once again. Due to its long (and well-advertised) association with the University of Liverpool, Chester continued to award Liverpool degrees until the 2005 intake of students.

In 2005, University College Chester was awarded full university status and became the University of Chester. This was followed by the right to award its own research degrees in 2007, ending Chester's last validation arrangement with Liverpool.

Following the 2008 Research Assessment Exercise, some of the university's research was declared to be of international quality, with a proportion of 'World Leading' research in History (15% of submitted research), English, Sports Studies, and Drama (each 5% of submitted research).

In 2010, the Centre for Work Related Studies (CWRS) received a commendation by the UK quality body, for its radically flexible and high quality negotiated work based learning framework - enabling professionals to customise their own qualifications, 'learn through work', and enable rapid accreditation of commercial training provision. At the same time, the funding body showcased CWRS's flexible approach to accrediting workplace learning.

Expansion 

The university has expanded in recent years, buying buildings in Chester and constructing student accommodation at Parkgate Road Campus in 2013. 
In 2013 the university took over the Shell Technology Centre in Thornton, in nearby Ince, creating the Thornton Science Park. 
In 2014, Chancellor George Osborne opened the university's new Science Park in Thornton. The campus was used for a variety of science and engineering based courses and allows students to be involved in high-level research using the campus's industry-standard facilities gifted by Shell.
In 2018 the local authority, taking account of guidance from the Health and Safety Executive, refused a retrospective planning application for continued use for educational purposes on safety grounds, due to the location close to Stanlow refinery.

In 2014, Loyd Grossman, who holds an honorary degree from the university, officially opened the North West Food Research Development (NoWFOOD) Centre.

Campuses 
The University of Chester has six campuses and a University Centre in Shrewsbury. The  Parkgate Road Campus, Chester, is located on Parkgate Road, just north of the City Walls. It has a mixture of Victorian buildings (such as Old College, left, which includes a chapel built by some of the original students in the 1840s) and modern buildings (such as the Students' Union). The Parkgate Road Campus also features a fitness centre, sports hall, swimming pool, science and language laboratories and bar.

Some departments are housed offsite at locations within walking distance of the main campus, for example, the Department of English is located in a Grade II-listed former Victorian vicarage, while the Law School is based at 67 Liverpool Road. The former County Hall, which is located in the city centre near the racecourse, houses the Faculty of Education and Children's Services and the Faculty of Health and Social Care and is known as the Riverside Campus.
The university has also developed the Kingsway Campus in Newton with the addition of a three-storey teaching block, ground floor exhibition space and art gallery, learning resource centre and changing rooms. The site features a number of green innovations, such as ground source heating.

The university acquired a former Lloyds Bank corporate headquarters in Queen's Park, Handbridge, Chester in 2015. This houses the Faculty of Business and Management and the Chester Business School. The university has modernised the facilities in Bridge House and Churchill House to cater for 2,700 students.

In the autumn of 2015, the university opened a sister institution in the Guildhall and Rowley's House, Shrewsbury, Shropshire as part of a joint venture with Shropshire Council to establish University Centre Shrewsbury.

The university-owned student accommodation is primarily reserved for first year and overseas students. This consists of halls of residence and houses nearby.

The smaller Warrington campus originally hosted a camp for Canadian officers in World War II and is located in the Padgate area of Warrington. This campus includes the North West Media Centre, which has close ties to Granada Television, The Warrington School of Management, Social Sciences and Health and Social Care. The Warrington Campus is also the training ground for the rugby league team The Warrington Wolves, and Warrington town was the host for the Rugby League World Cup 2013, with the Campus hosting the Samoan players. In 2022 two new buildings, Time Square and Remond House, were opened in Warrington Town Centre.

The university also has a number of bases at NHS sites across Cheshire and the Wirral, and opened University Centre Birkenhead in September 2018.

Organisation and structure 

The university is organised into seven faculties of study. Several of these are subdivided into academic departments. The faculties and departments are:

Faculty of Arts and Humanities
 School of Arts and Media
 School of Humanities
 Chester Centre for Research in Arts and Media

Chester Business School
 Centre for Work Related Studies
 Corporate Business and Enterprise
 University of Chester Business School
 Professional Development 
 Sport and Community Engagement
 Work Based Learning Office
 Chester Business School @ Warrington

 Faculty of Medicine, Dentistry and Life Sciences
 Biological Sciences
 Clinical Sciences and Nutrition
 Chester Medical School
 Sport and Exercise Sciences
 Centre for Stress Research

Faculty of Science and Engineering
 Centre for Science Communication
 Computer Science
 Chemical Engineering
 Electronic and Electrical Engineering
 Mathematics
 Mechanical Engineering
 Natural Sciences (Physics and Chemistry)
 New Technology Initiative (NTI)
 The Informatics Centre

Faculty of Social Sciences
 Geography and International Development
 Psychology
 Social and Political Science
 University of Chester Law School
 Institute of Policing

Faculty of Education and Children's Services

Faculty of Health and Social Care

In addition, a number of research centres operate alongside the departments.

From 2015 to 2020 the University of Chester provides validation for PhD programmes offered by Glyndŵr University.

Coat of arms 

The university's coat of arms was granted by the College of Arms in 1954. The arms, pictured above, are made up of an argent shield featuring the St George's cross on which there is a golden wheatsheaf, representing the Earldom of Cheshire. In the first quarter of the shield is a clasped open book, symbolising learning. The crest features a mitre, signifying the institution's founding by the Church of England, in front of two crossed swords, which are taken from the County of Cheshire's coat of arms. The golden scroll contains the Latin motto, "qui docet in doctrina", an extract from Saint Paul's epistle to the Romans and translates as "he that teacheth, on teaching" or "let the teacher teach".

The coat of arms was used as the college's logo until the early 1990s when a new logo, with a depiction of the Old College building, was introduced. The coat of arms returned to the college's logo in 2002 when a simplified version became part of the logo. The university's current logo, introduced in 2005, features the shield and scroll from the coat of arms.

From 2015, as part of the 175th-anniversary celebrations, the university's coat of arms was changed to include supporting griffins on either side – one in gold, and one in black reach referencing one of the institution’s founders. The gold griffin of Edward Smith-Stanley, 14th Earl of Derby bears the University Mace. The Black griffin of William Gladstone bears a sword. Each gorged with a collar of university colours red and white.

Academic profile 

There are approximately 1,737 administrative and academic members of staff. Many take part in research and often publish their work through the institution's own publishing house, the University of Chester Press. The 2014 Research Assessment Exercise resulted in Chester's research being declared world-leading in 14 areas of that submitted.

Former Archbishop of Canterbury Rowan Williams was, in 2011, bestowed a visiting professorship with the title Gladstone Professor of Literature and Theology. His inaugural lecture 'The Messiah and the novelist: approaches to Jesus in fiction' took place in Chester Cathedral.

Peter Blair and Ashley Chantler edit "Flash: The International Short-Short Story Magazine", a major literary periodical, which publishes stories and reviews of up to 360 words by writers from around the world.

At the beginning of April 2021, the university announced its intention to make up to 86 compulsory redundancies across staff in the Humanities department. The University and College Union has strongly condemned these plans, and student protests in opposition to the measures have taken place throughout the city.

Reputation and rankings 

The Quality Assurance Agency for Higher Education (QAA) 2010 audit praised the university for its good practice in ensuring standards and enhancing the quality of learning opportunities, the supportive relationships that underpin the learning and working in the institution and the strength of its partnership work.

The Faculty of Education and Children's Services also celebrated an 'outstanding' outcome in its recent Ofsted inspection of Initial Teacher Training.

Student life 
Chester Students' Union (CSU) offers services and provides facilities for students and is a member of the NUS. Four sabbatical officers are elected each year and serve a maximum of two years.

The Executive Committee are the trustees of the Union. Members are elected each year before the end of March, with a president and vice-president, and each with a different role, such as Education representative, Activities representative and a Warrington representative. The support staff for the Union consists of a number of full-time employees, part-time student staff and volunteers from the elected Executive Committee and the Union Council.

The Union runs a bar 'CH1' on the main Parkgate Road Campus, Chester. The previously known 'Padgate Union Bar' on the Warrington campus was, in August 2010, taken over by the university, and is now known as 'Bar and Club 2010'. The Union also has three shops. Two are on the Parkgate Road Campus, Chester, consisting of a general shop and a Starbucks Coffee franchise, and one at Warrington.

The Union also runs over 110 sports clubs and societies; with each campus having its own teams, many of which compete in British Universities and Colleges Sport competitions. Once a year, the Union runs an inter-campus competition known as Varsity on campus where sporting societies, such as seven-a-side football, and non-sporting societies, such as poker, compete. Non-sporting societies include the Debating Society (which has hosted hustings events which have featured on 'BBC North West Tonight'), the Politics Forum, the Drama Society, the Amnesty International Society, the International Development Society and the People and Planet Society. A student radio station, The Cat Radio, is based on the Warrington campus and broadcasts daily, with presenters on air from September until July.

Student body

Most of Chester's 14,900 students are from the United Kingdom. A quarter of students are mature and there are twice as many female students as male (partially due to the number of nursing, midwifery and teaching students).  The increasing number of foreign students are mainly participants in the university's active exchange policy.

Notable people

Chancellors 
 2005–2016: Major General Gerald Grosvenor, 6th Duke of Westminster
 2016 to date: Gyles Brandreth

Vice-chancellor/ Principals 
Until university status was awarded in 2005, the Vice-Chancellor was known as the principal.

 1839–1869: Arthur Rigg
 1869–1886: J. M. Chritchley
 1886–1890: A. J. C. Allen
 1890–1910: John Best
 1910–1935: Richard Thomas
 1935–1953: Stanley Astbury
 1953–1965: Aubrey Price
 1966–1971: Bernard de Bunsen
 1971–1987: Malcolm Seaborne
 1987–1998: Ned Binks
 1998–2019: Timothy Wheeler (Foundation Vice-Chancellor and Principal)
 2020–present: Eunice Simmons

Staff

 Rowan Williams,  Anglican bishop, theologian and poet
Stewart Ainsworth archaeologist (Department of History and Archaeology, 2010–present)
 Sir William Crookes, chemist (1855-unknown)
 Elaine Graham, theologian (Department of Theology and Religious Studies, 2009–present)
 Ron Geaves, theologian (Department of Theology and Religious Studies, 2001–2007)
 Anthony Thiselton, theologian (Department of Theology and Religious Studies, 2001–2006)
 Gordon Turnbull, psychiatrist (Centre for Research and Education in Psychological Trauma)
 Alan Wall, novelist (Department of English, 2004–present)
 Howard Williams, archaeologist (Department of History and Archaeology, 2008–present)

Alumni
 Alan Bleasdale, screenwriter (Cert Ed, 1964–1967)
 Jim Bowen, Bullseye presenter (Cert Ed Physical Education, 1957–1959)
 Sir Dave Brailsford CBE, Performance Director of British Cycling and General Manager of Team Sky, (BSc (Hons), Sports Science and Psychology, 1987–1990)
 John Carleton, international rugby union player
 Jon Clarke, international rugby league player (BSc (Hons) Sport and Exercise Sciences, 2006–2010)
 George Courtney MBE, international football referee (Cert Ed Geography, 1959–1961)
 Duffy, singer (BA (Hons) Commercial Music Production, 2003–2004; BA(Hons) Performing Arts, 2004–2006; dropped out)
Victoria Crebbin, Nurse (1999-2002)
 Alan Emery, geneticist (CertEd, 1945–1947)
 Jo Fletcher, international footballer (MSc Exercise and Nutrition Science, 2003–2005)
 Matt Greenhalgh, film director and screenwriter (BA(Hons) Media Studies with Business Management and Information Technology, 1992–1995)
 Dick Howard, international footballer (HND Physical Education, 1963–1965)
 Roderick Hunt MBE, children's author (Cert Ed Divinity and English, 1957–1959)
 Helen Jones MP, politician (PGCE)
 Eddie Lever, footballer and manager (Cert Ed, 1931–1933)
 J. Thomas Looney, deviser of the Oxfordian theory (Cert Ed, 1890–1891)
 Tracey Neville, international netball player (BSc(Hons) Nutrition and Exercise Science, 2004–2007)
 Jon Sleightholme, international rugby union player (1991–1994)
 David 'Comedy Dave' Vitty, radio presenter (BA(Hons) Media Studies and Business Management, 1992–1995)
 Nicola Wilson, equestrian rider BSc(Hons) Sport and Business Management, graduated 1999)
 Sir Walter Winterbottom, footballer and first manager of the England football team (Cert Ed, 1931–1933) 
 Rob Wotton, television and radio presenter (BA(Hons) Health and Community Studies, 1987–1990; Union President, 1990–1991)
 Lucy Letby, nurse (studied nursing)

See also
 Armorial of UK universities
 College of Education
 List of universities in the UK

References

Further reading 

 White, Graeme J, On Chester On: A History of Chester College and the University of Chester (Chester: University of Chester Press, 2014) 
 Dunn, Ian, The University of Chester, 1839–2008: The Bright Star in the Present Prospect 3rd edn (Chester: University of Chester Press, 2012)
 Burek, Cynthia and Stilwell, Richard, Geodiversity Trail: Walking Through the Past on the University's Chester Campus (Chester: Chester Academic Press, 2007)
 Newton, Elsie, The Padgate Story 1946–2006 (Chester: Chester Academic Press, 2007)
 White, Graeme J (ed.), Perspectives of Chester College: 150th Anniversary Essays, 1839–1989 (Chester: Chester College, 1989)
 Bradbury, John Lewis, Chester College and the Training of Teachers, 1839–1975 (Chester: Chester College, 1975)
 Astbury, Stanley, A History of Chester Diocesan Training College (Chester: Chester College, 1946)

External links 

 
 Chester Students' Union

 
Educational institutions established in 1839
1839 establishments in England
Universities UK